Myza is a genus of bird in the family Meliphagidae. Established by Adolf Bernhard Meyer and Lionel William Wiglesworth in 1895, it contains the following species:

The name Myza comes from the Greek word muzaō, meaning "to suck".

References

 
Bird genera
 
Endemic birds of Sulawesi
Taxa named by Adolf Bernhard Meyer
Taxa named by Lionel William Wiglesworth
Taxonomy articles created by Polbot